Vârciorog may refer to the following places in Romania:

Vârciorog, a commune in Bihor County
Vârciorog (Topa), a tributary of the Topa in Bihor County
Vârciorog Waterfall, a waterfall and protected area in Alba County